Vescio is a surname. Notable people with this surname include:

 Darcy Vescio (born 1993), Australian rules footballer
 Dave Vescio (born 1970), American actor, retired soldier, and photojournalist

Italian-language surnames